Louisa May Alcott (November 29, 1832March 6, 1888) was an American novelist, short story writer, and poet best known as the author of the novel Little Women (1868) and its sequels Little Men (1871) and Jo's Boys (1886). Raised in New England by her transcendentalist parents, Abigail May and Amos Bronson Alcott, she grew up among many well-known intellectuals of the day, such as Margaret Fuller, Ralph Waldo Emerson, Nathaniel Hawthorne, Henry David Thoreau, and Henry Wadsworth Longfellow.

Alcott's family suffered from financial difficulties, and while she worked to help support the family from an early age, she also sought an outlet in writing. She began to receive critical success for her writing in the 1860s. Early in her career, she sometimes used pen names such as A. M. Barnard, under which she wrote lurid short stories and sensation novels for adults that focused on passion and revenge.

Published in 1868, Little Women is set in the Alcott family home, Orchard House, in Concord, Massachusetts, and is loosely based on Alcott's childhood experiences with her three sisters, Abigail May Alcott Nieriker, Elizabeth Sewall Alcott, and Anna Alcott Pratt. The novel was well-received at the time and is still popular today among both children and adults. It has been adapted many times to stage, film, and television.

Alcott was an abolitionist and a feminist and remained unmarried throughout her life. All her life she was active in such reform movements as temperance and women's suffrage. She died from a stroke in Boston on March 6, 1888, just two days after her father had died.

Early life

Louisa May Alcott was born on November 29, 1832, in Germantown, which is now part of Philadelphia, Pennsylvania, on her father's 33rd birthday. She was the daughter of transcendentalist and educator Amos Bronson Alcott and social worker Abby May and the second of four daughters: Anna Bronson Alcott was the eldest; Elizabeth Sewall Alcott and Abigail May Alcott were the two youngest. As a child, she was a tomboy who preferred boys’ games. The family moved to Boston in 1834, where Alcott's father established an experimental school and joined the Transcendental Club with Ralph Waldo Emerson and Henry David Thoreau. Bronson Alcott's opinions on education and tough views on child-rearing as well as his moments of mental instability shaped young Alcott's mind with a desire to achieve perfection, a goal of the transcendentalists. His attitudes towards Alcott's wild and independent behavior, and his inability to provide for his family, created conflict between Bronson Alcott and his wife and daughters.  Abigail resented her husband's inability to recognize her sacrifices and related his thoughtlessness to the larger issue of the inequality of sexes.  She passed this recognition and desire to redress wrongs done to women on to Louisa.

The three years they spent at the rented Hosmer Cottage were described as idyllic. By 1843, the Alcott family moved, along with six other members of the Consociate Family, to the Utopian Fruitlands community for a brief interval in 1843–1844. After the collapse of the Utopian Fruitlands, they moved on to rented rooms and finally, with Abigail May Alcott's inheritance and financial help from Emerson, they purchased a homestead in Concord. They moved into the home they named "Hillside" on April 1, 1845, but had moved on by 1852 when it was sold to Nathaniel Hawthorne who renamed it The Wayside. Moving 22 times in 30 years, the Alcotts returned to Concord once again in 1857 and moved into Orchard House, a two-story clapboard farmhouse, in the spring of 1858.

Alcott's early education included lessons from the naturalist Henry David Thoreau who inspired her to write Thoreau's Flute based on her time at Walden Pond. Most of the education she received though, came from her father who was strict and believed in "the sweetness of self-denial." She also received some instruction from writers and educators such as Ralph Waldo Emerson, Nathaniel Hawthorne, Margaret Fuller, and Julia Ward Howe, all of whom were family friends. She later described these early years in a newspaper sketch entitled "Transcendental Wild Oats." The sketch was reprinted in the volume Silver Pitchers (1876), which relates the family's experiment in "plain living and high thinking" at Fruitlands.

Poverty made it necessary for Alcott to go to work at an early age as a teacher, seamstress, governess, domestic helper, and writer. Her sisters also supported the family, working as seamstresses, while their mother took on social work among the Irish immigrants. Only the youngest, Abigail, was able to attend public school. Due to all of these pressures, writing became a creative and emotional outlet for Alcott. Her first book was Flower Fables (1849), a selection of tales originally written for Ellen Emerson, daughter of Ralph Waldo Emerson. Alcott is quoted as saying "I wish I was rich, I was good, and we were all a happy family this day" and was driven in life not to be poor.

In 1847, she and her family served as station masters on the Underground Railroad, when they housed a fugitive slave for one week and had discussions with Frederick Douglass. Alcott read and admired the "Declaration of Sentiments", published by the Seneca Falls Convention on women's rights, advocating for women's suffrage and became the first woman to register to vote in Concord, Massachusetts in a school board election. The 1850s were hard times for the Alcotts, and in 1854 Louisa found solace at the Boston Theatre where she wrote The Rival Prima Donnas, which she later burned due to a quarrel between the actresses on who would play what role. At one point in 1857, unable to find work and filled with such despair, Alcott contemplated suicide. During that year, she read Elizabeth Gaskell's biography of Charlotte Brontë and found many parallels to her own life. In 1858, her younger sister Elizabeth died, and her older sister Anna married a man named John Pratt. This felt, to Alcott, to be a breaking up of their sisterhood.

Literary success

As an adult, Alcott was an abolitionist and a feminist. In 1860, Alcott began writing for the Atlantic Monthly. When the Civil War broke out, she served as a nurse in the Union Hospital in Georgetown, DC, for six weeks in 1862–1863. She intended to serve three months as a nurse, but halfway through she contracted typhoid fever and became deathly ill, though she eventually recovered. Her letters homerevised and published in the Boston anti-slavery paper Commonwealth and collected as Hospital Sketches (1863, republished with additions in 1869)brought her first critical recognition for her observations and humor. This was her first book and inspired by her army experience. She wrote about the mismanagement of hospitals and the indifference and callousness of some of the surgeons she encountered, and about her own passion for seeing the war first hand. Her main character, Tribulation Periwinkle, shows a passage from innocence to maturity and is a "serious and eloquent witness". Her novel Moods (1864), based on her own experience, was also promising.

After her service as a nurse, Alcott's father wrote her a heartfelt poem titled "To Louisa May Alcott. From her father". The poem describes how proud her father is of her for working as a nurse and helping injured soldiers as well as bringing cheer and love into their home. He ends the poem by telling her she's in his heart for being a selfless faithful daughter. This poem was featured in the books Louisa May Alcott: Her Life, Letters, and Journals (1889) and Louisa May Alcott, the Children's Friend, which talks about her childhood and close relationship with her father.

Between 1863 and 1872, Alcott anonymously wrote at least thirty-three "gothic thrillers" for popular magazines and papers such as The Flag of Our Union; they began to be rediscovered only in 1975. In the mid-1860s she wrote passionate, fiery novels and sensational stories akin to those of English authors Wilkie Collins and Mary Elizabeth Braddon under the nom de plume A. M. Barnard. Among these are A Long Fatal Love Chase and Pauline's Passion and Punishment. Her protagonists for these books, like those of Collins and Braddon (who also included feminist characters in their writings), are strong, smart, and determined. She also produced stories for children, and after they became popular, she did not go back to writing for adults. Other books she wrote are the anonymously published novelette A Modern Mephistopheles (1877), which attracted suspicion that it was authored by Julian Hawthorne, and the semi-autobiographical novel Work (1873).

Catherine Ross Nickerson credits Alcott with creating one of the earliest works of detective fiction in American literature, preceded only by Edgar Allan Poe's "The Murders in the Rue Morgue" and his other Auguste Dupin stories, with the 1865 thriller "V.V., or Plots and Counterplots." A short story published anonymously by Alcott, it concerns a Scottish aristocrat who tries to prove that a mysterious woman has killed his fiancée and cousin. The detective on the case, Antoine Dupres, is a parody of Poe's Dupin who is less concerned with solving the crime than in setting up a way to reveal the solution with a dramatic flourish.

Alcott became even more successful with the first part of Little Women: or Meg, Jo, Beth and Amy (1868), a semi-autobiographical account of her childhood with her sisters in Concord, Massachusetts, published by the Roberts Brothers. When Alcott returned to Boston following her travels in Europe, she became an editor at a magazine, Merry's Museum. It was here where she met Thomas Niles, who encouraged the writing of Part I of the novel, asking her to create a book especially for girls. Part II, or Part Second, also known as Good Wives (1869), followed the March sisters into adulthood and marriage. Little Men (1871) detailed Jo's life at the Plumfield School that she founded with her husband Professor Bhaer at the conclusion of Part Two of Little Women. Lastly, Jo's Boys (1886) completed the "March Family Saga".

In Little Women, Alcott based her heroine "Jo" on herself. But whereas Jo marries at the end of the story, Alcott remained single throughout her life. She explained her "spinsterhood" in an interview with Louise Chandler Moulton, "I am more than half-persuaded that I am a man's soul put by some freak of nature into a woman's body.... because I have fallen in love with so many pretty girls and never once the least bit with any man.” However, Alcott's romance while in Europe with the young Polish man Ladislas "Laddie" Wisniewski was detailed in her journals but then deleted by Alcott herself before her death. Alcott identified Laddie as the model for Laurie in Little Women. Likewise, every character seems to be paralleled to some extent with people from Alcott's lifefrom Beth's death mirroring Lizzie's to Jo's rivalry with the youngest, Amy, as Alcott felt a rivalry for (Abigail) May, at times. Though Alcott never married, she did take in May's daughter, Louisa, after May's untimely death in 1879, caring for little "Lulu" for the next eight years.

In addition to drawing on her own life during the development of Little Women, Alcott also took influence from several of her earlier works including "The Sisters' Trial," "A Modern Cinderella," and "In the Garret." The characters within these short stories and poems, in addition to Alcott's own family and personal relationships, inspired the general concepts and bases for many of the characters within Little Women as well as the author's subsequent novels.

Little Women was well-received, with critics and audiences finding it suitable for many age groupsa fresh, natural representation of daily life. An Eclectic Magazine reviewer called it "the very best of books to reach the hearts of the young of any age from six to sixty". With the success of Little Women, Alcott shied away from the attention and would sometimes act as a servant when fans would come to her house.

Along with Elizabeth Stoddard, Rebecca Harding Davis, Anne Moncure Crane, and others, Alcott was part of a group of female authors during the Gilded Age, who addressed women's issues in a modern and candid manner. Their works were, as one newspaper columnist of the period commented, "among the decided 'signs of the times'".

Louisa May Alcott was inducted into the National Women's Hall of Fame in 1996.

Later years
In 1877, Alcott was one of the founders of the Women's Educational and Industrial Union in Boston. After her youngest sister May died in 1879, Louisa took over the care of her niece, Lulu, who was named after Louisa. Alcott suffered chronic health problems in her later years, including vertigo. She and her earliest biographers attributed her illness and death to mercury poisoning. During her American Civil War service, Alcott contracted typhoid fever and was treated with a compound containing mercury. Recent analysis of Alcott's illness suggests that her chronic health problems may have been associated with an autoimmune disease, not mercury exposure. However, mercury is a known trigger for autoimmune diseases as well. An 1870 portrait of Alcott does show her cheeks to be quite flushed, perhaps with the "butterfly rash" across cheeks and nose which is often characteristic of lupus, but there is no conclusive evidence available for a firm diagnosis.

Alcott died of a stroke at age 55 in Boston, on March 6, 1888, two days after her father's death. She is buried in Sleepy Hollow Cemetery in Concord, near Emerson, Hawthorne, and Thoreau, on a hillside now known as "Authors' Ridge". Her niece Lulu was only eight years old when Louisa died. She was cared for by Anna Alcott Pratt, then reunited with her father in Europe and lived abroad until her death in 1976.

Louisa frequently wrote in her journals about going on long walks and runs. She challenged prevailing social norms regarding gender by encouraging her young female readers to run as well. 

The Alcotts' Concord, Massachusetts home, Orchard House (c. 1650), where the family lived for 25 years and where Little Women was written and set in 1868, has been a historic house museum since 1912, and pays homage to the Alcotts by focusing on public education and historic preservation. Her Boston home is featured on the Boston Women's Heritage Trail.

Selected works

The Little Women series
 Little Women, or Meg, Jo, Beth and Amy (1868)
 Part Second of Little Women, or "Good Wives", published in 1869; and afterward published together with Little Women.
 Little Men: Life at Plumfield with Jo's Boys (1871)
 Jo's Boys and How They Turned Out: A Sequel to "Little Men" (1886)

Novels
 The Inheritance (1849, unpublished until 1997)
 Moods (1865, revised 1882)
 The Mysterious Key and What It Opened (1867)
 An Old Fashioned Girl (1870)
 Will's Wonder Book (1870)
 Work: A Story of Experience (1873)
 Beginning Again, Being a Continuation of Work (1875)
 Eight Cousins or The Aunt-Hill (1875)
 Rose in Bloom: A Sequel to Eight Cousins (1876)
 Under the Lilacs (1878)
 Jack and Jill: A Village Story (1880)
 Proverb Stories (1882)

As A. M. Barnard
 Behind a Mask, or a Woman's Power (1866)
 The Abbot's Ghost, or Maurice Treherne's Temptation (1867)
 A Long Fatal Love Chase (1866; first published 1995)

Published anonymously
 A Modern Mephistopheles (1877)

Short story collections for children
 Aunt Jo's Scrap-Bag (1872–1882). (66 short stories in six volumes)
 1. "Aunt Jo's Scrap-Bag"
 2. "Shawl-Straps"
 3. "Cupid and Chow-Chow"
 4. "My Girls, Etc."
 5. "Jimmy's Cruise in the Pinafore, Etc."
 6. "An Old-Fashioned Thanksgiving, Etc."
 Lulu's Library (1886–1889) A collection of 32 short stories in three volumes.
 Flower Fables (1849)
 On Picket Duty, and other tales (1864)
 Morning-Glories and Other Stories (1867) Eight fantasy stories and four poems for children, including: *"A Strange Island", (1868); * "The Rose Family: A Fairy Tale" (1864), "A Christmas Song", "Morning Glories", "Shadow-Children", "Poppy's Pranks", "What the Swallows did", "Little Gulliver", "The Whale's story", "Goldfin and Silvertail".
 Kitty's Class Day and Other Stories (Three Proverb Stories), 1868, (includes "Kitty's Class Day", "Aunt Kipp" and "Psyche's Art")
 Spinning-Wheel Stories*  (1884). A collection of 12 short stories.
 The Candy Country (1885) (One short story)
 May Flowers (1887) (One short story)
 Mountain-Laurel and Maidenhair (1887) (One short story)
 A Garland for Girls (1887). A collection of seven short stories.
 The Brownie and the Princess (2004). A collection of ten short stories.

Other short stories and novelettes
 Hospital Sketches (1863)
 Pauline's Passion and Punishment (1863)
 Thoreau's Flute (1863)
 My Contraband, first published as The Brothers (1863)
 Doctor Dorn's Revenge (1868)
 La Jeune; or, Actress and Woman (1868)
 Countess Varazoff (1868)
 The Romance of a Bouquet (1868)
 A Laugh and A Look (1868)
 Perilous Play (1869)
 Lost in a Pyramid, or the Mummy's Curse
 Transcendental Wild Oats (1873) A short piece about Alcott's family and the Transcendental Movement.
 Silver Pitchers, and Independence: A Centennial Love Story (1876)
 A Whisper in the Dark (1877)
 Comic Tragedies (1893, posthumous)

In popular culture
Little Women inspired film versions in 1933, 1949, 1994, 2018, and 2019. The novel also inspired television series in 1958, 1970, 1978, and 2017, and anime versions in 1981 and 1987.

Little Women also inspired a BBC Radio 4 version in 2017.

Little Men inspired film versions in 1934, 1940, and 1998. This novel also was the basis for a 1998 television series.

Other films based on Alcott novels and stories are An Old-Fashioned Girl (1949), The Inheritance (1997), and An Old Fashioned Thanksgiving (2008). In 2009 PBS produced an  American Masters episode titled "Louisa May Alcott – The Woman Behind 'Little Women' ". In 2016 a Google Doodle of the author was created by Google artist Sophie Diao.

A dramatized version of Alcott appeared as a character in the television series Dickinson, in the episode "There's a Certain Slant of Light," which premiered on November 1, 2019. Alcott was portrayed by Zosia Mamet.

References

Bibliography

Further reading
 
 
 Elbert, Sarah. A Hunger for Home: Louisa May Alcott and Little Women (Temple UP, 1984).
  
 
  
  This book won the Pulitzer Prize for Biography or Autobiography in 2008.
 
  
  
 Paolucci, Stefano. Da Piccole donne a Piccoli uomini: Louisa May Alcott ai Colli Albani, "Castelli Romani," LVII, n. 6, nov.–dec. 2017, pp. 163–175.
  This book was the basis for a PBS documentary directed by Nancy Porter.
  
 Seiple, Samantha (2019). Louisa on the Front Lines: Louisa May Alcott in the Civil War. New York: Seal Press, Hachette Book Group. .

External links

Sources
 
 
 Works by Louisa May Alcott at Project Gutenberg Australia
 
 
 Works by Louisa May Alcott at Online Books Page
 Index entry for Louisa May Alcott at Poets' Corner
 Bibliography (including primary works and information on secondary literature – critical essays, theses and dissertations)

Archival materials
 Guide to Louisa May Alcott papers, MS Am 800.23 at Houghton Library, Harvard University
 Guide to Louisa May Alcott additional papers, 1839–1888, MS Am 2114 at Houghton Library, Harvard University
 Guide to Louisa May Alcott additional papers, 1845–1945, MS Am 1817 at Houghton Library, Harvard University
 Guide to Louisa May Alcott additional papers, 1849–1887, MS Am 1130.13 at Houghton Library, Harvard University
 Guide to Louisa May Alcott papers, MSS 503 at L. Tom Perry Special Collections, Brigham Young University
 Madeline B. Stern Papers on Louisa May Alcott, MSS 3953 at L. Tom Perry Special Collections, Brigham Young University
 Carolyn Davis collection of Louisa May Alcott at the University of Maryland Libraries

Other 
 Louisa May Alcott: The Woman Behind ‘Little Women’ – American Masters documentary (PBS)
 The Louisa May Alcott Society A scholarly organization devoted to her life and works.
 Louisa May Alcott, the real woman who wrote Little Women. Documentary materials.
 Obituary, New York Times, March 7, 1888, Louisa M. Alcott Dead
 Minneapolis Tribune, March 7, 1888, Obituary: Miss Louisa M. Alcott
 Encyclopædia Britannica, Louisa May Alcott
 Louisa May Alcott's Orchard House Louisa May Alcott's Orchard House historic site in Concord, MA.
 Norwood, Arlisha. "Louisa Alcott". National Women's History Museum. 2017.
 Matteson, J. (November 2009). Little Woman; The devilish, dutiful daughter Louisa May Alcott. Humanities, 30(6), 1–6.
 Louisa May Alcott s Orchard House. (n.d.). Retrieved March 20, 2018
 Hooper, E. (September 23, 2017). Louisa May Alcott: A Difficult Woman Who Got Things Done. Retrieved March 20, 2018,
 Powell, K. (n.d.). Louisa May Alcott Family Tree and Genealogy – ThoughtCo.. Retrieved March 20, 2018
 Louisa M. Alcott Dead – archive.nytimes.com. (March 7, 1888). Retrieved March 20, 2018
 Alcott: 'Not The Little Woman You Thought She Was'. (December 28, 2009). Retrieved March 20, 2018
 Raga, S. (November 29, 2017). 10 Little Facts About Louisa May Alcott. Retrieved March 20, 2018, National Women's Hall of Fame

1832 births
1888 deaths
19th-century American novelists
19th-century American poets
19th-century American women writers
Alcott family
American children's writers
American Civil War nurses
American women nurses
American feminist writers
American suffragists
American temperance activists
American women novelists
American women poets
American women's rights activists
Female wartime nurses
Members of the Transcendental Club
People from Concord, Massachusetts
Writers from Dedham, Massachusetts
People from South End, Boston
Pseudonymous women writers
Underground Railroad people
American women children's writers
Women in the American Civil War
Writers from Boston
Novelists from Pennsylvania
Writers from Philadelphia
Writers of Gothic fiction
Sewall family
Quincy family
Novelists from Massachusetts
19th-century pseudonymous writers